A list of former British colonies, dependencies and dates when they severed legal ties with Britain:

Gains in sovereignty
Rockall (1955) – annexed to the Crown on 18 September.

Losses in sovereignty or other jurisdiction
The Thirteen Colonies declared independence from Great Britain on 4 July 1776.
 (1922) – see Unilateral Declaration of Egyptian Independence.
Weihai (1930) – fully restored to  Republic of China sovereignty on 1 October.
The Statue also affirmed the British Parliament wouldn't legislate for the Dominions unless explicitly requested. 
 (1947) – partitioned on 15 August into the independent dominions of  India and  Pakistan.
 (1949) – incorporated into Canada as a province on 31 March.
 (1956) – independence granted on 1 January (was a condominium with )
 (as ) (1957) – independence granted  on 6 March.
 (1960) – became part of a unified  on 1 July.
 British Cameroon (1961) – southern part incorporated into  on 1 October and northern part incorporated into  on 31 may.
 and  independence granted to Nigeria as federal republic on 1 October; Kenya on 12 December.
 (as ), Malta, and Zambia (1964) – independence granted to Malawi on 6 July; Malta on 21 September; Zambia as a republic on 24 October.
 (1965) – independence granted on 18 February.
 (1970) – independence granted on 10 October.
 (1973) – independence granted on 10 July.
 (1982) – enactment of the Canada Act, 1982, ends the last remining reliances of the Canadian Crown on the British Parliament for constitutional amendments.
 (1983) – independence granted on 19 September. Anguilla remains a British overseas territory.
 (1997) – returned to the People's Republic of China as a Special Administrative Region on 1 July as per the Sino-British Joint Declaration.

Termination of personal union or other connection with the United Kingdom's monarchy

 (1949) – dominion status ended by unilateral legislative act on 18 April and left the Commonwealth.
 (1950) – dominion status ended by constitutional amendment on 26 January.
 (1956) – dominion status ended with new constitution on 23 March.
 (1960) – Commonwealth realm status ended by referendum on 1 July.
 (1961) – dominion status ended by referendum on 31 May and left the Commonwealth.
 (1962) – Commonwealth realm status ended on 9 December.
 (1963) – Commonwealth realm status ended by Constitution of Uganda constitutional amendment on 9 October.
 (1964) – Commonwealth realm status ended with new constitution on 12 December.
 (1971) – Commonwealth realm status ended on 19 April.
 (1972) – dominion status ended on 22 May; renamed Sri Lanka.
 (1974) – Commonwealth realm status ended on 13 December.
 (1976) – Commonwealth realm status ended on 1 March.
 (1992) – Commonwealth realm status ended on 12 March.
 (2021) – Commonwealth realm status ended by constitutional amendment on 30 November.

Other changes
 (1986) – severed legal ties (see: Constitution Act 1986) with Britain, but (see: Monarchy of New Zealand) retained Elizabeth II as head of state.
 (1987) – post-coup end of dominion status accepted on 15 October. Elizabeth II remained traditional (though unofficial) Paramount Chief until 2012, when the informal links with the British monarchy have been terminated.
 (2003) – court of final appeal transferred from the Judicial Committee of the Privy Council to the Supreme Court of New Zealand, which was created in 2004.

References

Political history of the United Kingdom